Mary-Dulany James (born February 1, 1960) is an American politician who has represented District 34 in the Maryland Senate since 2023. She was previously a member of the District 34A in the Maryland House of Delegates for sixteen years, representing Harford and Cecil Counties along the U.S. Route 40 corridor. Mary-Dulany James represented district 34A, formerly district 34, for 16 years having first been elected in 1998.

In 2014 and 2018, James unsuccessfully ran for the Maryland Senate in District 34. In 2022, she launched her third bid for the state senate seat, this time defeating Deputy Secretary of the Maryland Department of Disabilities and former state delegate Christian Miele in the general election.

Early life, education, career
James was born in Baltimore, Maryland, to father William S. James, then a state senator for Harford County, and mother Margaret James, a homemaker. She grew up and still lives on her family's farm in Harford County, and attended Havre De Grace High School and the University of Maryland, College Park where she earned a B.S. in psychology with honors in 1981. James attended the University of Maryland School of Law, earning a Juris Doctor degree with honors in 1986. While studying for the bar exam, she clerked for Judge Edward Skottowe Northrop in the U.S. District Court for the District of Maryland. She was admitted to Maryland Bar in 1986. She worked for law firms in Baltimore, then set up her own practice in Harford County where she lived.

James ran for the Maryland House of Delegates in 1998, seeking to replace one of two outgoing state delegates in District 34 (Mary Louise Preis and Nancy Jacobs, both of whom ran for state senate). She won the Democratic primary with 22 percent of the vote, and later won the general election on November 3, 1998, with 18 percent of the vote.

Political career

Maryland House of Delegates
James was elected to the House of Delegates on November 3, 1998, representing District 34 (Harford County). James was re-elected to the newly redistricted District 34A (Harford and Cecil counties) in November 5, 2002, and was subsequently re-elected in 2006, and 2010.

Committee assignments
Member, Appropriations Committee, 1999-2014
oversight committee on personnel, 1999–2003
oversight committee on program open space & agricultural land preservation, 1999–2002
vice-chair, transportation & the environment subcommittee, 2003–2006, member, 1999–2006
chair, oversight committee on pensions, 2003–2006, member, 2003-2014
chair, health & human resources subcommittee, 2007-2014
Joint Subcommittee on Program Open Space and Agricultural Preservation, 2003–2015
Special Joint Committee on Pensions, 2003–Present, house chair, 2003–2006
Member, Joint Committee on Base Realignment and Closure, 2007–2011
Member, Joint Committee on the Chesapeake and Atlantic Coastal Bays Critical Area, 2003–07
Chair, Harford County Delegation, 2001–02, vice-chair, 1999–2000
Member, Maryland Green Caucus, 1999-2014
Member, Women Legislators of Maryland, 1999–2015, co-chair, legislative committee, 2005–2015
Member Maryland Rural Caucus, 2002-2014
Maryland Bicycle and Pedestrian Caucus, 2003-2014
Maryland Veterans Caucus, 2005-2014
Member, National Conference of State Legislatures 
Member, economic development, trade & cultural affairs committee, 2005–2007
Member, labor & economic development committee, 2007–2015

Maryland Senate

Elections

2014

In June 2013, James said that she was considering a run for the Maryland Senate in District 34, after state senator Nancy Jacobs said she would not run for re-election in 2014. At the time, James was the only Democratic member of the Harford County delegation. James filed to run for the state senate seat in November 2013, and faced former state senator Art Helton in the Democratic primary, who she defeated in the June 2014 primary election by a 2-to-1 margin. She faced Republican challenger Bob Cassilly in the general election, and sought to position herself as an independent Democrat, noting her votes against gas- and sales-tax increases. James was defeated by Cassilly in the general election on November 3, 2014, receiving 42.7 percent of the vote to Cassilly's 57.2 percent.

2018
In 2018, James filed to run for the Maryland Senate in District 34, seeking a rematch between her and incumbent state senator Bob Cassilly. She faced former state delegate Barbara Osborn Kreamer in the Democratic primary election, which she won by a 3-to-1 margin. James lost to Cassilly in a tight general election on November 6, 2018, receiving 49.7 percent of the vote to Cassilly's 50.1 percent, or by a 189 vote margin out of 48,788 votes cast.

2022
In January 2022, James launched her third bid for the Maryland Senate in District 34, seeking to succeed state senator Bob Cassilly, who ran for Harford County executive in 2022. She defeated state delegate Mary Ann Lisanti in the Democratic primary election on July 19, 2022, by a 2-to-1 margin, and faced Republican challenger Christian Miele in the general election.

In the general election, James received financial support from President of the Maryland Senate Bill Ferguson and the Senate Democratic Caucus. She also accused her opponent, Republican Christian Miele, of being a carpetbagger, noting that he previously represented Baltimore County in the Maryland House of Delegates before moving to Harford County. James defeated Miele in a tight general election on November 8, receiving 50.55 percent of the vote to Miele's 49.24 percent, or by a margin of 591 votes out of 45,223 votes cast. She is set to become the first Democrat to represent District 34 in the Maryland Senate since 1994.

Tenure
James was sworn into the Maryland Senate on January 11, 2023. She is a member of the Judicial Proceedings Committee and the Executive Nominations Committee.

Personal life
James was married to her husband, Brian Feeney, before the two divorced. Together, they had three children and lived in Havre de Grace, Maryland.

On September 30, 2018, James' daughter, Evelyn Ann James Feeney, suddenly died. This led to James stopping all campaign activities leading up to the general election.

Political positions
While in the Maryland House of Delegates, James was considered a moderate to conservative Democrat. In January 2012, she formed a Blue Dog caucus in the state legislature along with other centrist Democratic members of the Maryland House of Delegates.

Energy
In February 2013, James voted for a bill that would allow a surcharge of up to $2 a month on residential natural gas bills to pay for new pipelines and distribution system upgrades. The bill passed the Maryland House of Delegates by a vote of 119-18, and later passed the state senate by a vote of 34-13.

Gun control
During the 2013 legislative session, James was one of 18 Democratic state delegates to vote against the Firearm Safety Act of 2013, a bill that placed restrictions on firearm purchases and magazine capacity in semi-automatic rifles.

Healthcare
In April 2014, James expressed concerns regarding the state's overhaul of its health exchange to adopt technology from the Connecticut's health exchange program, saying that there were "huge budgetary implications" in switching to the Connecticut model.

Social issues
In 2005, James was one of 36 Democratic state delegates to vote for a bill that would legalize slot machines at four locations in the state. The bill passed the House of Delegates by a 71-66 vote.

In 2006, James voted for a bill that would create a ballot referendum to legalize same-sex marriage in Maryland. The bill failed to pass out of the Maryland House of Delegates on a 61-78 vote. In 2012, she voted against the Civil Marriage Protection Act, which legalized same-sex marriage in Maryland.

Taxes
In April 2004, James was one of two Democratic state delegates to switch their no votes to yes to revive a $1 billion tax plan proposed by Speaker of the Maryland House of Delegates Michael E. Busch, after House Appropriations Committee Chairman Norman Conway persuaded her to change her vote. She later defended her vote change, saying that she "thought it deserved a full hearing on the House floor".

In November 2007, James voted for a bill that raised corporate and income taxes, and voted against another bill that increased the state sales tax, car tilting tax, and hotel tax.

In May 2012, James was one of 18 Democratic state delegates to vote against a bill that raised $300 million in tax hikes.

In March 2013, James was one of 22 Democratic state delegates to vote against a bill that would raise the state's gas tax and index future increases to inflation to replenish the state's transportation fund.

Unions
In March 2010, James said she opposed a bill that would give collective bargaining rights to librarians, saying that she thought it was inappropriate "for the state to be telling the local governments how to conduct themselves".

Electoral history

References

External links
Legislative homepage
Campaign website
Facebook Page
Twitter @MaryDulanyJames

Democratic Party members of the Maryland House of Delegates
1960 births
Living people
Maryland lawyers
Women state legislators in Maryland
University of Maryland, College Park alumni
University of Maryland Francis King Carey School of Law alumni
21st-century American politicians
21st-century American women politicians
20th-century American politicians
20th-century American women politicians
Democratic Party Maryland state senators